EHV may refer to:
Equine herpesvirus, a group of viruses that affect horses
Extra high voltage, a type of power supply
Evangelical Heritage Version, an English language translation of the Bible